Brooks Air Force Base was a United States Air Force facility located in San Antonio, Texas,  southeast of Downtown San Antonio.

In 2002, Brooks Air Force Base was renamed Brooks City-Base when the property was conveyed to the Brooks Development Authority as part of a unique project between local, state, and federal government.  The Brooks Development Authority is now the owner and operator of the  property, and is redeveloping it as a science, business, and technology center.  The Air Force was the largest tenant at Brooks City-Base.

Units

Major units
 311th Air Base Group
 311th Human Systems Wing

Tenant units
 Air Force Audit Agency
 Air Force Research Laboratory

History
On February 16, 1918, Kelly Field No. 5 became a separate post and named Brooks Field by the Aviation Section, U.S. Signal Corps to honor San Antonio aviator Sidney Johnson Brooks, Jr.  The first commander of Brooks Field was Lt. Col. H. Conger Pratt, who until the preceding October had been a cavalryman.

From its founding until 1919, Brooks Field was used to train cadets in the Curtiss JN-4 aircraft, which was used for balloon and airship training. The program was cancelled in 1922 when the U.S. Army re-evaluated the usefulness of balloons and airships.

After the cancellation of the airship training, the 11th School Group was formed at Brooks Field as the Primary Flying School for the Air Service and Army Air Corps.  The Primary Flying School continued operation until 1931 when it moved to Randolph Field in San Antonio. After the Primary Flying School's departure, Brooks Field became the new home for the Aerial Observation Center.

During World War II, Brooks Field housed the School for Combat Observers and the Advanced Flying School (Observation). The program remained in operation until 1943 when it was disbanded. Training in the school then switched to twin-engine aircraft, subsequently training pilots to fly the B-25 bomber.

After the war, Brooks Field became the home to several tactical and reserve units, and in 1948, Brooks Field formally became Brooks Air Force Base.

Since the early 1950s, Brooks AFB has been the home for the Aerospace Medical Center, which would include the School of Aerospace Medicine (SAM). In 1957, SAM scientists moved into the newly completed center at Brooks AFB. SAM aided the National Aeronautics and Space Administration (NASA) with Project Mercury and served as a back-up site for lunar samples brought back to Earth on the Apollo missions between 1969 and 1972. The air evacuation program at Brooks AFB proved vital to the care of wounded personnel in the Vietnam War.

President John F. Kennedy dedicated the School of Aerospace Medicine on November 21, 1963, the day before he was assassinated in Dallas, Texas.  This was Kennedy's last official act as president.

After the Vietnam War, the base's mission narrowed to one centered on specific research related to U.S. Air Force fliers and personnel. In 1991, the Air Force was selected to house the Armstrong Laboratory, which included the Air Force Human Resources Laboratory, the Air Force Drug Testing Laboratory, the Harry G. Armstrong Aerospace Medical Research Laboratory, the Air Force Occupational and Environmental Health Laboratory, and the laboratory functions of SAM.

BRAC
Following the 1995 BRAC, when Brooks AFB was removed from the Base Realignment and Closure list, city, state, military, and community planners began several years of hard work to develop a plan to privatize approved the gradual transition in ownership of Brooks AFB from the Air Force to the Brooks Development Authority. This transition came into full effect on July 22, 2002, when the Brooks Development Authority assumed control of the newly named Brooks City-Base.

In 2005, Brooks City-Base was once again placed on the BRAC list. Air Force operations ceased on 15 September 2011. Brooks City-Base inactivated the 311th Air Base Group on 1 Sept, 2011, and the remaining few USAF personnel had shuttered the base for good by the 15th of that month.

Historic Hangar 9 
Brooks Field Hangar 9 was restored in 1969 to become the U.S. Air Force Museum of Aerospace Medicine. This museum is to display the early history of Brooks Field and to preserve and display an extensive collection of photographs and equipment related to aviation and aerospace medicine.

Previous names
 Gosport Field, prior to December 5, 1917
 Signal Corps Aviation School, Kelly Field #5, December 5, 1917

Major commands

USAAC/USAAF
 Department of Military Aeronautics, 1918-unk (later, Director of Air Service)
 Air Corps Training Cen, September 1, 1926 (also Eighth Corps Area [USA], 1921–1940)
 Gulf Coast Air Corps Training Cen, December 11, 1940 – May 1, 1942
 Gulf Coast AAF Training Cen, May 1, 1942 – July 1, 1943
 AAF Central Flying Training Comd, July 31, 1943 – December 1, 1945
 Continental Air Forces, December 1, 1945 – March 21, 1946

United States Air Force
 Strategic Air Command, March 21, 1946 – March 23, 1946
 Tactical Air Command, March 23, 1946 – January 15, 1947
 Air Defense Command, January 15, 1947 – December 1, 1948
 Continental Air Command, December 1, 1948 – October 1, 1969
 United States Air Force Security Service, April 18, 1949 - July 31, 1953
 Air Training Command, October 1, 1959 – November 1, 1961
 Air Force Systems Command, November 1, 1961 – July 1, 1992
 Air Force Materiel Command, July 1, 1992 – September 1, 2011

Base operating units

USAAS/USAAC/USAAF
 67th Aero Squadron (Service), April 6, 1918 – June 27, 1918
 Squadron "B" Brooks Fld, June 27, 1918 – November 14, 1918
 Flying School Det, Brooks Fld, November 14, 1918 –  May 1919
 Air Corps Balloon and Airship School, Brooks Fld, c. May 1919 – June 1922
 11th School Group (Primary Flying School), c. June 1922 – July 1931
46th and 47th School Squadrons, 62nd Service Squadron
 62d Service Sq, c. July 1931 – August 1936
 8th Air Base Sq, c. September 1936 – c. June 1939
 Unknown, July–August 1939
 63d Air Base Gp, Sp, September 1, 1940 – November 1, 1941
 53d Air Base Sq, November 1, 1941 – June 27, 1942
 53d Base HQ and Air Base Sq, June 27, 1942 – May 1, 1944
 2510th AAF Base Unit, May 1, 1944 – November 30, 1945
 306th AAF Base Unit, November 30, 1945 – September 26, 1947

United States Air Force
 306th AF Base Unit, September 26, 1947 – August 28, 1948
 2595th Base Service Sq, August 28, 1948 – February 1, 1949
 2595th Air Base Gp, February 1, 1949 – January 1, 1954
 2577th Air Force Reserve Flying Training Cen, January 1, 1954 – September 15, 1954
 2577th Air Reserve Flying Training Cen, September 15, 1954 – April 8, 1958
 2577th Air Base Gp, April 8, 1958 – October 1, 1959
 3790th Air Base Gp, October 1, 1959 – July 1, 1961
 Human Systems Center July 1, 1992 – October 1, 1998
 6570th Air Base Gp, October 1, 1961 – July 1, 1992
 648th Air Base Gp, July 1, 1992 – May 1, 1994
 311th Human Systems Wing

Government and infrastructure
The United States Postal Service Post Office at 8060 Aeromedical Road closed in late May 2011.

See also

 Texas World War II Army Airfields
 List of United States Army airfields
 Hangar 9, Brooks City-Base

References

Sources
 Mueller, Robert (1989). Active Air Force Bases Within the United States of America on 17 September 1982. USAF Reference Series, Maxwell AFB, Alabama: Office of Air Force History. ISBN 0-912799-53-6
 Maurer, Maurer (1983). Air Force Combat Units Of World War II. Maxwell AFB, Alabama: Office of Air Force History. ISBN 0-89201-092-4.
 Mauer, Mauer (1969), Combat Squadrons of the Air Force, World War II, Air Force Historical Studies Office, Maxwell AFB, Alabama. ISBN 0-89201-097-5
 Shaw, Frederick J. (2004), Locating Air Force Base Sites History's Legacy, Air Force History and  Museums Program, United States Air Force, Washington DC, 2004.

External links
 USAF Brooks City-Base (official site)
  Brooks City-Base / Brooks Development Authority (official site)
 U.S. Air Force School of Aerospace Medicine (USAFSAM)
 Brooks City-Base at GlobalSecurity.org
 Aviation: From Sand Dunes to Sonic Booms, a National Park Service Discover Our Shared Heritage Travel Itinerary
 Google Map of Brooks City-Base
 http://www.mysanantonio.com/news/military/article/Air-Force-era-at-Brooks-ends-2150025.php

1917 establishments in the United States
Military in San Antonio
Bases of the United States Air Force
Military facilities in Texas
Airfields of the United States Army Air Service
Airfields of the United States Army Air Corps
Initial United States Air Force installations
Airfields of the United States Army Air Forces in Texas
Buildings and structures in San Antonio